Friedrich Hermann "Fritz" Buchloh (26 November 1909 – 22 July 1998) was a German football manager and footballer who played as a goalkeeper. He was born in Mülheim an der Ruhr, Germany. Buchloh was the last surviving member of Germany's 1934 World Cup squad.

Club career 
In the domestic league he played for VfB Speldorf.

International career 
He was a participant in the two World Cups, in 1934 and 1938 but didn't play a single minute in both tournaments. Buchloh won 17 caps for Germany. He was also part of Germany's squad at the 1936 Summer Olympics.

Coaching career 
In the year 1949 he managed the Iceland national football team.

References

External links
 
 

1909 births
1998 deaths
German footballers
Association football goalkeepers
Hertha BSC players
Germany international footballers
1934 FIFA World Cup players
1938 FIFA World Cup players
Olympic footballers of Germany
Footballers at the 1936 Summer Olympics
German football managers
Expatriate football managers in Iceland
Iceland national football team managers
Schwarz-Weiß Essen managers
Sportspeople from Mülheim
People from the Rhine Province
Knattspyrnufélagið Víkingur managers
Footballers from North Rhine-Westphalia